SARPA S.A.S. (Spanish: Servicios Aéreos Panamericanos S.A.S.) is an air charter and air ambulance operator, with its main base at El Dorado International Airport in Bogotá, and an auxiliary base in Medellín.

History
The airline was founded in June 1980 in Puerto Asís, Putumayo Department. It started providing support to small cities and towns, grew to become a rotorcraft operator providing support to drilling companies in the Colombian eastern plains, started fixed wing operations in 2004, and since evolved to become one of the major on demand operators in Colombia.

In October 2021, SARPA received its certification to operate commercial routes from its base José María Córdova International Airport with Embraer ERJ145 and began flights on December 15, 2021.

Destinations
SARPA operates commercial flights to the following airports:

Fleet

SARPA operates the following aircraft as of March 2023:

The airline operates all around Colombia and internationally. Pioneer of Air Ambulance operation in Colombia, first operator to obtain an Operating Certificate for air ambulance operations in the country.

See also
List of airlines of Colombia

References

External links

Airlines of Colombia
Airlines established in 1980
Colombian companies established in 1980